Latrodectus antheratus is a venomous spider in the genus Latrodectus, native to Paraguay and Argentina. It can have some red on the back and has the red hourglass marking.

References

antheratus
Spiders of South America
Spiders described in 1932